Parviz Parastui (born 24 June 1955) is an Iranian actor. He has received various accolades, including four Crystal Simorgh for Best Actor–making him the only actor to have four wins in that category–four Hafez Awards, two Iran Cinema Celebration Awards and an Iran's Film Critics and Writers Association Awards.

Personal life
Parastui was born in Kabudrahang, Hamadan province. He served in the Iran-Iraq war.

Early life 
Parviz Parastui had worked in judicature before he became an actor. He began his career by starring in the film Diar-e Asheghan. Following Diare Asheghan, Parastui began a long lasting career in films.

Career

Film 
After starring in films such as Pishtazan-e Fath, Hunting, etc., Parviz Parastui acted as "Sadeq Meshkini", a comedy role in the highly acclaimed yet controversial movie Leily Is with Me directed by Kamal Tabrizi. The war film Leily Is with Me brought a new perspective to the Iran–Iraq War which up to then was viewed as taboo material. The movie tells the comical story of a war-fearing employee of Iranian Television Broadcasting unknowingly advancing straight to enemy lines, while actually trying to flee the war when he is assigned to accompany a director to a city close to enemy lines to film a documentary piece.
Since then, Parastui has expanded his presence as a comedy film actor by starring in other revolutionary comedy films.

Parviz Parastui also starred in some war films like: The Red Ribbon, The Glass Agency, Dead Wave, etc. Ebrahim Hatamikia directed most of Parastui's war films.
Parviz Parastui had been known as a comedian with playing roles in The Snowman, The Glass Love, Marde Avazi before he played a role in the satire film The Lizard, another work by Kamal Tabrizi.
He gained major popularity and fame after playing in Marmoulak as "Reza Marmoulak". Parastui in The Willow Tree, Majid Majidi the role of "Joseph", Performance was brilliant.
Today, Reza Mirkarimi latest Movie of Important He is.

Television 
Parastui's TV works include series such as: The Apartment, The Martyr of Kufa, The Red Soil, Under the Pillory and The Chef.

He was awarded the Best Actor title in International TV Programs Rome Festival for playing in Under the Pillory. He also plays the lead role in The Accomplice series.

Music 

Besides acting in movies and on stage, Parastui is a singer and so far has recorded three albums. His first album called Daddy was released in 2006 and his second album Im Parviz Parastui was released in 2013. Parastui's most recent album, I'm an Actor, was released in 2014.

Filmography

Awards and nominations

he received numerous accolades throughout his career spanned, including four Crystal Simorgh for Best Actor, making him the first and only actor to have four wins in that category

References

External links

 
 
  His Profile on IranActor.com
 TIFF.net | Toronto International Film Festival – Today
 FilmNetNews.com | Latest news about Parviz Parastooi

1955 births
Living people
Iranian male film actors
Iranian male voice actors
Iranian male stage actors
Iranian male television actors
20th-century Iranian male actors
21st-century Iranian male actors
21st-century Iranian male singers
Recipients of the Order of Culture and Art
Crystal Simorgh for Best Actor winners
Crystal Simorgh for Best Supporting Actor winners